The 1983 New England Patriots season was the franchise's 14th season in the National Football League and 24th overall. The Patriots played inconsistently all season, but at 8–7 had a chance for a playoff spot with a win in their final game of the season in Seattle. The Patriots would have problems with turnovers as rookie quarterback Tony Eason was swallowed up in a 24–6 loss to the Seahawks.

In the first week of December, in shocking conditions with sleet and snow, the Patriots’ game with wild card contender New Orleans Saints saw just one score set up by Ricky Smith returning the Saints’ initial kickoff to the 3-yard line. As of 2017, this game remains the most recent 7–0 result in NFL history, with only two games since seeing just one score, both a single field goal.

Draft

Staff

Roster

Regular season

Schedule

Standings

Notes

References

See also 
 List of New England Patriots seasons

New England Patriots
New England Patriots seasons
New England Patriots
Sports competitions in Foxborough, Massachusetts